Arthur Thomas Gietzelt, AO (28 December 1920 – 5 January 2014) was an Australian politician and minister.

Arthur Gietzelt was born in San Francisco of Australian-born parents, and educated at Hurstville High School in south-western Sydney. He served in the armed forces in New Guinea during World War II from 1941 to 1946 along with his younger brother Ray Gietzelt.

Later, Gietzelt served 15 years (1956–1971) in local government as a councillor of Sutherland Shire Council; for nine of those years he was shire president or mayor. As part of the council, he opposed the creation of a second Sydney airport at Towra Point. He was elected as a Senator for New South Wales at the 1970 Senate election.

In 1976 Gietzelt joined Jim Cairns, Barry Egan and Bridget Gilling as a member of the Tribunal on Homosexuals and Discrimination. He was appointed Minister for Veterans' Affairs in March 1983 in the first Hawke Ministry and held that position until July 1987.  He was a joint Father of the Senate from 1987 until his departure from parliament.  He resigned from the Senate in February 1989.

Gietzelt was made an Officer of the Order of Australia in 1992 for "service to the Australian Parliament and to local government".

Gietzelt died on 5 January 2014, aged 93.

His younger brother was Ray Gietzelt, a famous Australian trade unionist who led the Federated Miscellaneous Workers' Union of Australia (FMWU; later known as United Voice) from 1955 to 1984.

References

1920 births
2014 deaths
Australian Labor Party members of the Parliament of Australia
Members of the Australian Senate for New South Wales
Members of the Australian Senate
Officers of the Order of Australia
Australian Army personnel of World War II
Australian Army soldiers
Labor Left politicians
People from San Francisco
People from the Sutherland Shire
Mayors of places in New South Wales
20th-century Australian politicians
American emigrants to Australia